David Nicholl (14 June 1871 – 11 March 1918) was a Welsh international rugby union forward who played club rugby for Llanelli and international rugby for Wales.

Rugby career
Nicholl first played rugby for Llandovery College, following his older brother Charles Nicholl. Unlike Charles, Nicholl did not go to university and settled in Llanelli as a bank cashier. Nicholl represented Llanelli at club level, and in 1894, he was selected for his one and only international cap for the Welsh national team. The match was played against Ireland as part of the 1894 Home Nations Championship, and Nicholl, along with Jack Elliott and Neath's Fred Hutchinson. Wales lost the game by a single penalty goal, the game having slowed due to a very boggy Belfast pitch.

International matches played
Wales
 Ireland  1894

Bibliography

References 

1871 births
1918 deaths
Llanelli RFC players
People educated at Llandovery College
Rugby union forwards
Rugby union players from Carmarthenshire
Wales international rugby union players
Welsh rugby union players